A powered air-purifying respirator (PAPR) is a type of respirator used to safeguard workers against contaminated air. PAPRs consist of a headgear-and-fan assembly that takes ambient air contaminated with one or more type of pollutant or pathogen, actively removes (filters) a sufficient proportion of these hazards, and then delivers the clean air to the user's face or mouth and nose.  They have a higher assigned protection factor than filtering facepiece respirators such as N95 masks.  PAPRs are sometimes called positive-pressure masks, blower units, or just blowers.

Description
The modularity of PAPRs allows them to be customized for different working environments. Regardless of type, a PAPR consists of:

 some kind of headgear (mask or hood), 
 a powered (motor-driven) fan which forces incoming air into the device,
 a filter (or multiple filters) for delivery to the user for breathing, and
 a battery or other power source.

The mask may be hard and tight-fitting, or flexible and loose-fitting. The former affords a higher level of protection, but is less comfortable.  Tight-fitting PAPRs require a fit test, while loose-fitting ones do not.  This makes loose-fitting PAPRs useful when a fit test for a tight-fitting respirator cannot be successfully passed, for example when facial hair is present.  Masks may be reusable or disposable.  Some masks allow the full face to be seen by others, aiding in interpersonal communication.

The fan, filter, and power-pack may be carried around freely by the user, often secured by a belt around the waist. Alternatively, with certain units, the air is fed to the user via lengthy tubing while the fans and filters are remotely mounted.
 
PAPRs have low breathing resistance, unlike filtering facepiece respirators such as N95 masks.  A PAPR may have adjustable air flow rates for added comfort.  While they are often referred to as positive pressure masks, they are not true positive-pressure devices as overbreathing can overcome the pressure supplied by the fan.

Filters
PAPRs may be outfitted with mechanical filters for atmospheres with particulate contamination, with a chemical cartridge for atmospheres with toxic gases or vapors, or both in combination.  PAPRs can provide an assigned protection factor between 25 and 1000 depending on the type, as compared to an N95 mask's assigned protection factor of 10. Loose-fitting PAPRs typically have an APF of 25, and PAPRs with elastomeric masks that seal to the face (similar to those in elastomeric respirator masks) have an APF of 1000. When comparing various makes and models of PAPR, the supporting documentation from each of the respective manufacturers should be consulted in order to confirm the APF value of each product. 
 
In the United States, HE (high-efficiency) filters are the class of particulate filter used with PAPRs.  These are 99.97% efficient against 0.3 micron particles, the same as a P100 filter.  PAPR HE filters used in industry are generally re-used until they are soiled, damaged, or reduce PAPR air flow below specified levels. In healthcare settings involving a live virus, CDC recommends that a practical replacement cycle be implemented.

The type of filter incorporated into a PAPR must be appropriate to the contaminants that need to be removed. Some respirators are designed to remove fine particulate matter such as the dust created during various woodworking processes, or from working with mineral-based materials.  When used with high-efficiency particulate air (HEPA) filters, airborne particles containing pathogens (viruses, bacteria) smaller than 5 microns will be removed. (PAPRs are typically required for lab workers in BSL-3 facilities, and sometimes in BSL-2 as well.) 
 
When used in combination with the correct filters, [PAPRs] are suitable for working with volatile organic compounds such as those used in many spray paints. At the same time, the filters that are suitable for volatile substances must typically have their filter elements replaced more often than particulate filters. In addition, there is some confusion over terminology. Some literature and users will refer to a particulate filtering unit as a dust mask or filter and then use the term respirator to mean a unit that can handle organic solvents.

Usage 

According to the NIOSH Respirator Selection Logic, PAPRs are recommended for concentrations of hazardous particulates or gases that are greater than the relevant occupational exposure limit but less than the immediately dangerous to life or health (IDLH) level and the manufacturer's maximum-use concentration, subject to the respirator having a sufficient assigned protection factor.  For substances hazardous to the eyes, a respirator equipped with a full facepiece, helmet, or hood is recommended.  PAPRs are not effective during firefighting, in an oxygen-deficient atmosphere, or in an unknown atmosphere; in these situations a self-contained breathing apparatus or supplied-air respirator is recommended instead. 
  
PAPRs have the advantage of eliminating breathing resistance caused by unpowered negative-pressure respirators such as N95 masks.  This makes them usable by persons who are medically disqualified from negative-pressure respirators.  Loose-fitting PAPRs may also be selected for people who cannot pass a fit test due to facial hair or other reasons.  PAPRs have disadvantages in terms of ergonomic impacts, and they restrict peripheral vision.

In healthcare 
Because they provide higher assigned protection factors, PAPRs are suitable for use during aerosol-generating procedures and by hospital first receivers.  In healthcare settings, CDC recommends cleaning of all components except the filter after each use; care must be taken to select PAPRs that are not damaged or deteriorate due to cleaning and disinfecting agents.

In healthcare, a product known as the Racal suit can be used, consisting of a plastic suit and a PAPR fitted with HEPA filters. They were used by the U.S. Army Aeromedical Isolation Team to perform medical evacuations of patients with highly infectious diseases.

For CBRN defense

Some PAPRs have special certification for chemical, biological, radiological, and nuclear contaminants (CBRN).  In the United States, they must be certified to resist permeation of chemical warfare agents, which may involve additional protective coverings; that gas or vapor will not pass through the filter before a specified amount of time; and its ability to fit a wide range of facial sizes and shapes.

Under immediately dangerous to life or health (IDLH) conditions, tight‐fitting full facepiece gas mask respirators with canisters (those with "14G approval") with CBRN approval may be used for escape, but loose‐fitting hoods and cartridges (those with "23C approval") with CBRN approval may not.  Neither may be used to enter an IDLH atmosphere.  The 23C CBRN PAPRs also must not be used if liquid droplet exposure occurs.

See also 

Respirator assigned protection factors
Workplace respirator testing

References

Emergency medical responders
Safety clothing
Headgear
Respirators